Silvanus difficilis, is a species of silvan flat bark beetle widespread in Oriental region. It is introduced to Australia via timber and also to Costa Rica.

Distribution
Many Oriental countries including, Malaya, India, Sri Lanka, Vietnam, Taiwan, Singapore, Sumatra, Java, Christmas Island, Sarawak, Borneo, Philippines, Moluccas, and New Guinea. Also found in Oceanian regions of Solomon Islands, Samoan Islands, and introduced to Australia. There are records from West Africa, Britain, New Ireland and Costa Rica.

Description
Extremely variable species in appearance, very similar to Silvanus lewisi, Silvanus robustus and Silvanus productus. Two distinct forms are described and identified: 'Normal form' and 'New Guinea form'. The 'Normal form' clearly identified from the 'New Guinea form' due to its short temple, and wider and shorter prothorax.

Average length is about 2.17 to 2.64 mm. Body elongated, and slightly depressed. Body color ranges from dull brown to yellow-brown and covered with short, semi-erect, golden pubescence. Head broader than long. Punctures on frontal triangle often ocellate. Eyes are large with temples as long as eye-facets. Antennae broad and clubbed. Pronotum broad and more elongate. Pronotum puncturation is coarse and dense, similar to head. Prosternum with tuberculate surface which become rugose towards sides. Prothorax convex, and elongated. Scutellum large, transverse and pubescent.

Ecology
Adults have been collected from Shorea robusta in India. They have found among commodities imported to Britain from the Oriental region.

References 

Silvanidae
Insects of Sri Lanka
Insects of India
Insects described in 1973